Constance Mary Wilde (née Lloyd; 2 January 1858 – 7 April 1898) was an Irish author. She was the wife of Irish playwright Oscar Wilde and the mother of their two sons, Cyril and Vyvyan.

Early life and marriage

The daughter of Horace Lloyd, an Anglo-Irish barrister, and Adelaide Barbara Atkinson, who had married in 1855 in Dublin, Constance Lloyd was born at her parents' home in Harewood Square, Marylebone, London. Registration of births did not become compulsory until 1875 and her parents omitted to do this. 

She married Wilde at St James's Church, Paddington on 29 May 1884. Their two sons Cyril and Vyvyan were born in the next two years.

In 1888 Constance Wilde published a book based on children's stories she had heard from her grandmother, called There Was Once. She and her husband were involved in the dress reform movement.

It is unknown at what point Constance became aware of her husband's homosexual relationships. In 1891 she met his lover Lord Alfred Douglas when Wilde brought him to their home for a visit. Around this time Wilde was living more in hotels, such as the Avondale Hotel, than at their home in Tite Street. Since the birth of their second son, they had become sexually estranged.

In 1894, Constance was staying in Worthing with Oscar Wilde and started assembling a collection of epigrams ("Oscariana") from Wilde's works. The intention was that it be published by Arthur Humphreys, with whom she briefly fell in love that summer. In the event the book was published privately the following year.

According to son Vyvyan's 1954 autobiography, the boys had a relatively happy childhood and their father was a loving parent. Richard Ellman's biography of Wilde recounted an occasion when he warned his sons about naughty boys who made their mamas cry; they asked him what happened to absent papas who made mamas cry. Nevertheless, by all accounts, she and Wilde remained on good terms.

After Wilde's conviction and imprisonment, Constance changed her and her sons' last name to Holland to dissociate them from his scandal. The couple never divorced, but Constance forced Wilde to give up his parental rights. She moved with her sons to Switzerland and enrolled them in an English-language boarding school in Germany. They never saw their father again.

Constance visited Oscar in prison so she could tell him the news of his mother's death. After he had been released from prison, she refused to send him any money unless he no longer associated with Douglas.

Illness and death
Constance died on 7 April 1898, five days after a surgery conducted by Luigi Maria Bossi. According to The Guardian, "theories [about her death] have ranged from spinal damage following a fall down stairs to syphilis caught from her husband." Also according to The Guardian, Merlin Holland, grandson of Oscar Wilde, "unearthed medical evidence within private family letters, which has enabled a doctor to determine the likely cause of Constance's demise. The letters reveal symptoms nowadays associated with multiple sclerosis but apparently wrongly diagnosed by her two doctors". Multiple sclerosis was then a little-known condition.

Constance sought help from two doctors. One of them was a "nerve doctor" from Heidelberg, Germany, who resorted to dubious remedies. The second doctor—Luigi Maria Bossi—conducted two operations (for uterine fibroid) in 1895 and 1898, the latter of which ultimately led to her death.  According to The Lancet, "the surgery Bossi performed in December 1895 was probably an anterior vaginal wall repair to correct urinary difficulties from a presumed bladder prolapse. In retrospect, the actual problem was probably neurogenic and not structural in origin".

During the second surgery in April 1898, Bossi probably "did not attempt a hysterectomy but merely excised the tumour in a myomectomy". Shortly after the surgery Constance developed uncontrollable vomiting which led to dehydration and death. The immediate cause of death is thought to have been severe paralytic ileus, which developed either as a result of the surgery itself or of intra-abdominal sepsis. Constance is buried in Genoa (Italy), in the Monumental Cemetery of Staglieno.   A memorial statue depicting a nude pregnant Constance is included in the Oscar Wilde Memorial Sculpture in Merrion Square in Dublin.

Gallery

References

Further reading
Moyle, Franny (2011). Constance: the Tragic and Scandalous Life of Mrs Oscar Wilde. John Murray.

External links

1858 births
1898 deaths
British children's writers
Irish children's writers
Oscar Wilde
Neurological disease deaths in Liguria
Deaths from multiple sclerosis
Irish people of English descent